Psychological Reports is a bimonthly peer-reviewed academic journal covering research in psychology and psychiatry. It was established by Robert and Carol H. Ammons in 1955. The editor-in-chief is Cory Scherer (Penn State Schuylkill). It is published by SAGE Publications.

Abstracting and indexing 
Psychological Reports is abstracted and indexed in the Social Sciences Citation Index and MEDLINE. In 2017, the journal's impact factor was 0.667, and it was ranked 107th out of 135 journals in the category "Psychology, Multidisciplinary."

References

External links 
 

Psychology journals
Psychiatry journals
Bimonthly journals
Publications established in 1955
English-language journals